Japanese–Portugal relations describes the foreign relations between Japan and Portugal. Although Portuguese sailors visited Japan first in 1543, diplomatic relations started in the nineteenth century.

History

16th century

The first affiliation between Portugal and Japan started in 1543, when Portuguese explorers landed in the southern archipelago of Japan, becoming the first Europeans to reach Japan. This period of time is often entitled Nanban trade, where both Europeans and Asians would engage in mercantilism.
The Portuguese at this time would found the port of Nagasaki, through the initiative of the Jesuit Gaspar Vilela and the Daimyo lord Ōmura Sumitada, in 1571.

The expansion for commerce extended Portuguese influence in Japan, particularly in Kyushu, where the port became a strategic hot spot after the Portuguese assistance to Daimyo Sumitada on repelling an attack on the harbor by the Ryūzōji clan in 1578.

The cargo of the first Portuguese ships upon docking in Japan were basically cargo coming from China (silk, porcelain, etc.). The Japanese craved these goods, which were prohibited from the contacts with the Chinese by the Emperor as punishment for the attacks of the Wokou piracy. Thus, the Portuguese acted as intermediaries in Asian trade.

In 1592 the Portuguese trade with Japan started being increasingly challenged by Chinese smugglers on their reeds, in addition to Spanish vessels coming to Manila in 1600, the Dutch in 1609, and English in 1613.

One of the many things that the Japanese were interested in were Portuguese guns.
The first three Europeans to arrive in Japan in 1543 were Portuguese traders António Mota, Francisco Zeimoto and António Peixoto (also presumably Fernão Mendes Pinto).
They arrived at the southern tip of Tanegashima, where they would introduce firearms to the local population. These muskets would later receive the name after its location.

Because Japan was in the midst of a civil war, called the Sengoku period, the Japanese bought many Portuguese guns. Oda Nobunaga, a famous daimyo who nearly unified all of Japan, made extensive use of guns (arquebus) playing a key role in the Battle of Nagashino. Within a year, Japanese smiths were able to reproduce the mechanism and began to mass-produce the Portuguese arms. Later on, Tanegashima firearms were improved and Japanese matchlocks were of superior quality. As with Chinese experimentation with firearms of this period, the Japanese developed better sights and cord protection. And just 50 years later, his armies were equipped with a number of weapons perhaps greater than any contemporary army in Europe. The weapons were extremely important in the unification of Japan under Toyotomi Hideyoshi and Tokugawa Ieyasu, as well as in the invasion of Korea in 1592 and 1597. Europeans brought by trade not only weapons, but also soap, tobacco, and other unknown products in Feudal Japan.

After the Portuguese first made contact with Japan in 1543, a large scale slave trade developed in which Portuguese purchased Japanese as slaves in Japan and sold them to various locations overseas, including Portugal itself, throughout the sixteenth and seventeenth centuries. Many documents mention the large slave trade along with protests against the enslavement of Japanese. Hundreds of Japanese especially women were sold as slaves. Japanese slaves are believed to be the first of their nation to end up in Europe, and the Portuguese purchased large numbers of Japanese slave girls to bring to Portugal for sexual purposes, as noted by the Church in 1555. King Sebastian feared that it was having a negative effect on Catholic evangelization since the slave trade in Japanese was growing to larger proportions, so he commanded that it be banned in 1571

Japanese slave women were even sold as concubines, serving on Portuguese ships and trading in Japan, mentioned by Luis Cerqueira, a Portuguese Jesuit, in a 1598 document. Japanese slaves were brought by the Portuguese to Macau, where some of them not only ended up being enslaved to Portuguese, but as slaves to other slaves, with the Portuguese owning Malay and African slaves, who in turn owned Japanese slaves of their own.

Hideyoshi was so disgusted that his own Japanese people were being sold en masse into slavery on Kyushu, that he wrote a letter to Jesuit Vice-Provincial Gaspar Coelho on 24 July 1587 to demand the Portuguese, Siamese (Thai), and Cambodians stop purchasing and enslaving Japanese and return Japanese slaves who ended up as far as India. Hideyoshi blamed the Portuguese and Jesuits for this slave trade and banned Christian evangelization as a result.

Some Korean slaves were bought by the Portuguese and brought back to Portugal from Japan, where they had been among the tens of thousands of Korean prisoners of war transported to Japan during the Japanese invasions of Korea (1592–98). Historians pointed out that at the same time Hideyoshi expressed his indignation and outrage at the Portuguese trade in Japanese slaves, he himself was engaging in a mass slave trade of Korean prisoners of war in Japan.

Fillippo Sassetti saw some Chinese and Japanese slaves in Lisbon among the large slave community in 1578.

The Portuguese "highly regarded" Asian slaves like Chinese and Japanese, much more "than slaves from sub-Saharan Africa". The Portuguese attributed qualities like intelligence and industriousness to Chinese and Japanese slaves which is why they favored them more.

In 1595 a law was passed by Portugal banning the selling and buying of Chinese and Japanese slaves.

17th century 
When formal trade relations were established in 1609 by requests from Englishman William Adams, the Dutch were granted extensive trading rights and set up a Dutch East India Company trading outpost at Hirado. They traded exotic Asian goods such as spices, textiles, porcelain, and silk. When the Shimabara uprising of 1637 happened, in which Christian Japanese started a rebellion against the Tokugawa shogunate, it was crushed with the help of the Dutch. As a result, all Christian nations who gave aid to the rebels were expelled, leaving the Dutch the only commercial partner from the West. Among the expelled nations was Portugal who had a trading post in Nagasaki harbor on an artificial island called Dejima. In a move of the shogunate to take the Dutch trade away from the Hirado clan, the entire Dutch trading post was moved to Dejima.

19th century
Following the opening of Japan to trade with the west in the 1850s, the Shogun's government became more receptive to reestablishing diplomatic relations with the Portuguese government. On August 3, 1860, a commercial treaty was concluded between the two countries and diplomatic relations were established between them.

20th century

In the course of the Second World War, both countries had a complicated relationship. While Portugal was a neutral power, it was aligned more closely with the Allies, although it tried to stick closely to strict neutrality in East Asia to protect its vulnerable territories of Macau and East Timor. 

Macau was never under Japanese military occupation, causing it to become a center for refugees. However, in August 1943, Japanese troops seized a British steamer in the harbor of Macau and the next month, issued an ultimatum demanding the installation of Japanese advisors in the government, threatening direct military occupation. Portugal acceded to Japanese demands and Macau effectively became a Japanese protectorate. Upon discovering that Macau intended to sell aviation fuel to Japan, American forces launched several air raids on Macau throughout 1945. In 1950, the US government compensated the Portuguese government with US$20m for the air raid damage after a Portuguese government protest.

East Timor was occupied in 1942 by the Allies after Portugal refused to cooperate with the Allies in the defense of Southeast Asia. In the Battle of Timor, the Japanese occupied East Timor, remaining in control until Japanese troops in East Timor surrendered to the Portuguese governor as part of the surrender of Japan.

Language 
As a result of the Portuguese arrival to Japan, after a continuous influx of trade between Asia and Europe, Japanese vocabulary absorbed words of Portuguese origin as well as Portuguese of Japanese.
Among its great part, these words mainly refer to products and customs that arrived through Portuguese traders.

Portuguese was the first Western language to have a Japanese dictionary, the Nippo Jisho (日葡辞書, Nippojisho) dictionary or "Vocabulário da Língua do Japão" ("Vocabulary of the Language of Japan" in old-fashioned orthography), compiled by Jesuits such as João Rodrigues, published in Nagasaki in 1603.

Resident diplomatic missions
 Japan has an embassy in Lisbon.
 Portugal has an embassy in Tokyo.

See also 
Arte da Lingoa de Iapam
Christianity in Japan
Hidden Christians of Japan
History of Roman Catholicism in Japan
A Ilha dos Amores
List of Japanese words of Portuguese origin
Medical School of Japan
Nanban trade
Nippo Jisho
Tanegashima (Japanese matchlock)

References

External links 
 Embassy of Portugal in Japan 
 Embassy of Japan in Portugal 

 
Bilateral relations of Portugal
Portugal